Ian Shaw may refer to:

 Ian Shaw (Egyptologist) (born 1961), lecturer at the University of Liverpool
 Ian Shaw (singer) (born 1962), Welsh jazz singer and former stand-up comedian
 Ian Shaw (sport shooter) (born 1969), British sport shooter
 Ian Shaw (actor) (born 1969), British actor
 Ian Shaw (producer), English record producer
 Ian Shaw (rugby union), Scottish rugby player